The Nurragingy Nature Reserve is an Australian open urban park and forest, nature reserve and garden, it is a protected area owned by Western Sydney Parklands Trust and operated by Blacktown City Council that opened in 1981. The Nature Reserve is a site of state heritage significance because of its combination of historical, social and cultural values. The site was the first land grant ever given to Aboriginal people in Australia. 

The landscaped park is complete with unique features including bridges, pavilions and waterfalls, a native wildlife park, Chinese garden, New Zealand Garden, BBQ and picnic area and large conference centre for business meetings, weddings and other varying functions, it is a popular tourist attraction located in Knox Rd, Doonside and Rooty Hill, New South Wales

Land grant
The land grant is associated with two significant Aboriginal figures from the early colonial period – Nurragingy and Colebee – to whom the land was jointly granted in 1816. The location of the land grant is significant because it was an Aboriginal choice, being on land belonging to Nurragingy's clan. The land grant is valued by the contemporary Aboriginal community and the wider Australian community as a landmark in the history of cross-cultural engagement in Australia. For Aboriginal people, in particular, it represents a key historical site symbolising Aboriginal resilience and enduring links to the land (Godden, Mackay, Logan, 2010).

History

The name "Nurragingy" commemorates one of the two Aboriginal people of the Dharruk (Dharug, Daruk) tribe who received the first land grant to Aboriginal people from Governor of New South Wales, Lachlan Macquarie in 1819. The other title holder was Colebee, whose name has been given to the Centre within the Reserve. A painting by local Aboriginal artist Danny Eastwood, depicting this land grant hangs inside the Colebee Centre.

Prior to the 1970s the land was part of the Cumberland Timber Forest which was a supplier of commercial timber. In the 1970s the land was purchased by the New South Wales state government with the intention of turning it into a green belt for Western Sydney which was facing rapid expansion. In 1981 the state government allowed a portion of the land to be used as a recreational area.

Flora
The surrounding vegetation contains a number a vulnerable and regionally specific species such as Shale-Gravel Transition Forest, Alluvial Woodland and Shale Plain Woodland as a part of a Grey Box and Forest Red Gum woodland. Cabbage Gum's, Casuarina glauca and Melaeuca spp. are present in the creeks and ponds. The shrub layer includes Bursaria spinosa, Acacia decurrens and Dillwynia juniperina. The reserve is home to many herbs and grasses as well as wetland species around the creek and streambanks.

Chang Lai Yuan Chinese Gardens 
On 14 October 2003, Liaocheng municipality (Located in China) and Blacktown City council signed a sister city agreement. In May 2011, to foster ties of friendship and economic partnership the two municipalities signed a memorandum of understanding relating to the construction of an authentic Chinese garden at Nurragingy Reserve. It was officially opened in August 2012.
The name of the park is derived from a portmanteau of Dongchang (The former name of the Chinese municipality) and the Chinese translation of Blacktown (Bu Lai Ke Cheng).

The garden is styled with elements from both the Ming Dynasty and Qing Dynasty and includes a Gateway, Seven Arch Stone Bridge, Light Mountain Pavilion and a Waterfall Gazebo.

Gallery

See also
 Auburn Botanical Gardens
 Central Gardens Nature Reserve
 Brenan Park
 Western Sydney Parklands
 Rosford Street Reserve

References

1981 establishments in Australia
Forests of New South Wales
Gardens in New South Wales
Parks in Sydney
Protected areas established in 1981
Urban forests
Rooty Hill, New South Wales